Homebody or Homebodies may refer to:

Books
Homebody (novel) 1988 horror novel by Orson Scott Card 1988
Homebody, 1993 novel by Louise Titchener
Homebody/Kabul, play by Tony Kushner
Homebodies, 1954 book of illustrations by Charles Addams

Film and TV
Homebodies (film), horror comedy about pensioners against developers, 1974
"Homebodies", season 4 episode of CSI: Crime Scene Investigation

Music
"Homebody", song by Bush from The Chemicals Between Us
"Homebody", song by Zox from Take Me Home